Edward Geheves was the head coach for the Gonzaga University men's basketball team during the 1918-1920 seasons. While at Gonzaga, he acquired a record of 9-17 (.346).

References

Year of birth missing
Year of death missing
Gonzaga Bulldogs men's basketball coaches